North Port station may refer to:

 North Port light rail station, a light rail station in Melbourne, Australia previously served by the Port Melbourne rail line, now 109 tram
 Pier 4 station, proposed Manila Light Rail Transit (LRT) station previously proposed to be named North Port station